The Chalice of Crossdrum is a lost 18th century Roman Catholic liturgical vessel from Ireland.

Physical description

The chalice itself is described as,

History

The Chalice of Crossdrum was found in 1750 in Crossdrum, near Oldcastle, County Meath, Ireland.  The chalice was found in a cave, beside a priest's skeleton, along with other liturgical items, including a chasuble, an altar-stone, a crucifix, and candlesticks. Given its location, scene of discovery, and relative dates of the artifacts, scholars generally concur that the discovered priest was likely a Jesuit who covertly provided the sacraments to local Catholics during the Cromwellian period, when such activities were proscribed by the state. 
The man who made the discovery, Hugh Reilly, handed the discovery over to his brother, the Rev. Bartholomew Reilly, a parish priest in Co. Meath. The priest's skeleton was sacramentally buried, and the location of the other discovered items remains unknown.

The chalice and paten were subsequently passed from Rev. Bartholomew Reilly to Fr. Owen Reilly, the former's uncle, on the event of his death in 1782. Fr. Owen Reilly died in 1784. Debate surrounds the location of the chalice after Fr. Owen Reilly's ownership.

The chalice resurfaced in 1832, under the possession of Rev. George McDermot, parish priest of Oldcastle. The chalice was kept in the parish, coming under the ownership of Father George Leonard, the successor parish priest. It was at this time that the chalice took on a mythical element, supposedly granting the keeper longevity of life. Fr. Leonard died in 1877, at the age of 85. The chalice then passed to Leonard's nephew, Fr. Thomas Fagan, parish priest of Rathconnell, County Westmeath. Fr. Fagan died in 1886, and the chalice passed to Fr. Fagan's nephew, the Very Rev. Thomas Gaffney in Rutland, Vermont. Gaffney picked up the chalice in Ireland, after a conflict of ownership that required local diocesan intervention.

Since his acquisition of the chalice, Fr. Gaffney used the vessel in every celebration of the Feast of St Patrick, until his death in 1906. Ff. Gaffney, in his will, left the chalice in the hands of Fr. James A. Taaffe, S.J., of Fordham University in New York. Since Fr. Taaffe's ownership, the location of the chalice remains unconfirmed, some  speculating it remains in the hands of the aforementioned Jesuit university, among Taaffe's descendants in Long Island, or elsewhere.

References

Chalices
Archaeology of Ireland
Religion in County Meath